Fahmi Gulandaz Babel is an Awami League politician and the incumbent Member of Parliament from  Mymensingh-10,Gaffargaon constituency from where his father was 3 times elected MP.

Early life
Babel was born 23 June 1976. He is the son of former Awami League MP Altaf Hossain Golandaz.

Career
Babel was elected to Parliament in 2014 from Mymensingh-10 as an Awami League candidate. He is a member of the Parliamentary Standing Committee on the Ministry of Textile and Jute. In 2018 he was made a member of the executive committee of Bangladesh Awami League in Mymensingh District. He has been accused of torturing politicians in his constituency, including members of his own party.

Babel was re-elected from Mymensingh-10 in 2018 as a candidate of Awami League.

References

Awami League politicians
Living people
1976 births
10th Jatiya Sangsad members
11th Jatiya Sangsad members